Throckley is a village located in Newcastle upon Tyne, North East England, approximately  west of Newcastle city centre. Hadrian's Wall passed through the village, its course traced by the village's main road, Hexham Road. Throckley lies within the historic county of Northumberland.

Throckley was a colliery village, being adjacent to Throckley Colliery, but with the decline in the coal-mining industry the village has become more urbanised.

One of Throckley's more notable residents was William Brown, a consulting engineer in the 18th century, and part owner of Throckley Colliery, who was responsible for the construction of many colliery waggonways throughout the North East of England. As a youngster, George Stephenson worked on Dewley farm which lies to the north of the A69.

Throckley neighbours the villages of Newburn, Walbottle, Blucher, and across the border in Northumberland, Heddon-on-the-Wall. The village expanded with a number of new housing estates having been developed since the mid-2000s

Amenities include a supermarket, car parts shop, a number of hair salons, social clubs and a working men's club, three care homes for the elderly, two churches, a solarium, funeral parlour, an optometrist, medical surgery, a range of newsagents, a chemist, a Masonic hall, and a primary school (Throckley Primary School).

Throckley's economy is also boosted by the presence of an industrial estate, home to Throckley Brickworks and Warmseal Windows.

Sightseeing and scenery
Throckley itself, especially the Bank Top area, offers some views over the Tyne Valley, and looking west, to the distant Pennines. The Guardian featured Throckley in the top fifty walks guide for 2007.

Throckley Dene is a stretch of semi-natural ancient woodland in a steep-sided valley with Dewley Burn running through.

References

Bibliography
Dunham, A. C. & V. E. H. Strasser-King (1981) Petrology of the Great Whin Sill in the Throckley Borehole, Northumberland, Inst. Geol. Sci. Rep. 81–4; 32 pp.

Further reading

Walton, George Bygone Throckley. [Newcastle upon Tyne]: Newcastle City Libraries & Arts, 1994.

Villages in Tyne and Wear
Geography of Newcastle upon Tyne